Azghand Rural District is a rural district (dehestan) in Shadmehr District, Mahvelat County, Razavi Khorasan province, Iran. At the 2006 census, its population (including Shadmehr, which was promoted to city status and detached from the rural district) was 11,433, in 3,015 families; excluding Shadmehr, the population (as of 2006) was 8,064, in 2,167 families.  The rural district has 15 villages. The capital of the rural district is the village of Azghand.

References 

Rural Districts of Razavi Khorasan Province
Mahvelat County